The South Florida Classic was a golf tournament on the Nike Tour. It ran from 1998 to 1999. It was played at Palm-Aire Country Club (Palm Course) in Pompano Beach, Florida.

In 1999 the winner earned $40,500.

Winners

Former Korn Ferry Tour events
Golf in Florida
Recurring sporting events established in 1998
Recurring sporting events disestablished in 1999
Pompano Beach, Florida
1998 establishments in Florida
1999 disestablishments in Florida